Vitality is the capacity of a thing to live, grow, or develop.

Vitality may also refer to:

Organisations 
Team Vitality, a French esports organisation
 Vitality Corporate Services, a South Africa-based financial services company
 VitalityHealth, a United Kingdom-based health insurance company
 VitalityLife, a United Kingdom-based life insurance company

Vessels 
 HMS Vitality, called HMS Untamed (P58), a Royal Navy submarine 
 USS Vitality, called HMS Willowherb (K283), a US Navy–Royal Navy patrol boat

Other uses 
 Vitality curve, a business management practice
 Vitalism, a biological theory and natural philosophy
 Language vitality, the degree of endangerment of a language